A. L. M. Fazlur Rahman is a retired Bangladesh Army officer and former Director General of Bangladesh Rifles. Since retirement he has been working as a security analyst in Bangladesh.

Career
Rahman was a member of the Mukti Bahini and fought in the Bangladesh Liberation war. He was trained in the Mukti Bahini camp in Pyrdiwah. He was made the chief of Bangladesh Rifles on 29 February 2000, a post he held until 11 July 2001. During his tenure he advocated for a "hardline" on border issues with neighboring countries. He was the head of BDR, when they tried to retake Padua/Pyrdiwah from India and that caused the 2001 Bangladesh–India border clashes. The Indian Border Security Force blamed him specifically for the incident.

He founded the citizens organisation Nirdolio Jono Andolon in April 2004. He is a founding member of Mainamati Golf and Country Club in Comilla. He has expressed an anti-Indian opinion and has spoken out against India's influence in Bangladesh.

References

Living people
Bangladesh Army generals
Mukti Bahini personnel
Director Generals of Border Guards Bangladesh
Year of birth missing (living people)